Montmain is the name of two communes in France:
 Montmain, Côte-d'Or
 Montmain, Seine-Maritime

Other
 Montmains, a Premier cru vineyard in Chablis